The Brown Bears represent Brown University in ECAC women's ice hockey.

Offseason
August 16, 2011: Former Princeton Tigers assistant coach Amy Bourbeau has been named the new head coach of the Brown Bears. She is the third head coach in Brown's 47-year women's hockey history. She was honored by the American Hockey Coaches Association (AHCA) with its inaugural Women's Ice Hockey Assistant Coach Award.
September 28: Bears head coach Amy Bourbeau has appointed seniors Paige Pyett and Katelyn Landry as team captains for the upcoming year.

Recruiting

Regular season
The 17th Annual Mayor's Cup will take place on November 25 versus the Providence Friars.

Standings

Schedule

Conference record

Awards and honors

References

Brown
Brown Bears women's ice hockey seasons
Brown
Brown